Balacra nigripennis is a moth of the family Erebidae. It was described by Per Olof Christopher Aurivillius in 1904 and is found in Angola, Cameroon, the Central African Republic, the Democratic Republic of the Congo and Tanzania.

References

Balacra
Moths described in 1904
Insects of Cameroon
Insects of the Democratic Republic of the Congo
Insects of Angola
Fauna of the Central African Republic
Insects of Tanzania
Erebid moths of Africa